Mengzi Station is a metro station at Chengdu, Sichuan, China. It is opened on December 18, 2020 with the opening of Chengdu Metro Line 6.

Station Summary 
Mengzi station is located at the intersection of Pidu District,Chengdu (formerly Pixian County) Tianjian Road and West District Avenue, so the station is located in the former Lemonzi Village (now Lemonzi Village Community) and got this name. It was officially put into service on December 18, 2020.

References

Chengdu Metro stations
Railway stations in China opened in 2020